The Kingdom of Dahomey was an overseas possession of France—part of French West Africa—until 1958. In that year Dahomey became an autonomous republic, and gained full independence in 1960. The United States immediately recognized Dahomey and began the process of initiating diplomatic relations. A U.S. Embassy at Abidjan, Cote d'Ivoire (then named Ivory Coast) was established with Donald L. Norland as Chargé d'Affaires ad interim. The embassy was also accredited also to Dahomey, Niger, and Upper Volta (now named Burkina Faso) while resident at Abidjan. On July 31, 1960, Chargé Norland presented his credentials to the government of Dahomey, to take effect on August 1, 1960. On October 14, 1960, R. Borden Reams was appointed as the ambassador and presented his credentials on November 26, 1960.

On February 15, 1961, the Embassy in Cotonou, Dahomey, was established with Converse Hettinger as Chargé d'Affaires ad interim. Ambassador Reams remained resident in Abidjan.

In 1961 Robinson McIlvaine was appointed as Ambassador Extraordinary and Plenipotentiary with a separate commission solely to Dahomey. He presented his credentials to the government of Dahomey on June 22, 1961.

The Republic of Dahomey changed its name to Republic of Benin in 1975.

Ambassadors

See also
Benin – United States relations
Foreign relations of Benin
Ambassadors of the United States

Notes

External links
 United States Department of State: Chiefs of Mission for Benin
 United States Department of State: Benin
 United States Embassy in Cotonou
United States Department of State: Background notes on Benin

Benin
Main
United States